Franken may refer to:

Places
Franken, Haut-Rhin, a commune of the Haut-Rhin département of France
Franconia (wine region), or "Franken", one of the 13 wine regions of Germany
Franconia, or "Franken", a region situated in northern Bavaria and adjacent parts of Baden-Württemberg and Thuringia, Germany

People with the name
Franken (surname), a Dutch patronymic surname
The Francken family of Flemish painters is sometimes (rarely) written as "Franken"
Franken Fran, a Japanese manga and a fictional character
Franken Stein, a Japanese manga/anime fictional character

Other uses
Franken, an alternative name used in Germany for wine made from the Silvaner grape (Frankenriesling or Frankentraube)
Franc, or "Franken", a currency unit, its German name (Switzerland, Liechtenstein, and formerly Belgium and Luxembourg)
Franks, or "Franken", medieval Germanic tribes

See also
Francken (surname)
Frank (disambiguation)
Franke, surname